Searson is both a surname and a given name. Notable people with the name include:

Harry Searson (1924–2013), English footballer
Searson Wigginton (1909–1977), English cricketer

See also
Pearson (surname)